Events from the year 1694 in the Kingdom of Scotland.

Incumbents 
 Monarch – William II jointly with Mary II until 28 December, then as sole monarch.
 Secretary of State – John Dalrymple, Master of Stair, jointly with James Johnston

Law officers 
 Lord Advocate – Sir James Stewart
 Solicitor General for Scotland – ??

Judiciary 
 Lord President of the Court of Session – Lord Stair
 Lord Justice General – Lord Lothian
 Lord Justice Clerk – Lord Ormiston

Events 
 7 September – Thomas Joseph Nicolson is nominated titular bishop of Peristasis and first Vicar Apostolic of Scotland
 October 19 – A major windstorm continues for several days, spreading the Culbin Sands over a large area of farmland, in the County of Moray. The village of Culbin was buried and abandoned.

Births 
 4 October – Lord George Murray, Jacobite general (died 1760)
 15 October – Archibald Douglas, 1st Duke of Douglas, nobleman (died 1761)
date unknown
 Sir Robert Douglas, 6th Baronet, genealogist (died 1760)

Deaths 
 18 April – William Douglas, Duke of Hamilton, nobleman, summoned the Convention of Edinburgh which offered the Scottish crown to William and Mary in March 1689 (born 1634)
 25 July – Robert Fleming, Presbyterian minister (born 1630)
 28 December – Queen Mary II of Scotland (born 1662)

See also 
 Timeline of Scottish history

References 

 
Years of the 17th century in Scotland
1690s in Scotland